Hugh Richard Bonniwell Williams  (born 10 November 1963) is an English actor. He is well-known for portraying Robert Crawley, Earl of Grantham, in the ITV historical drama series Downton Abbey. His performance on the show earned him a nomination at the Golden Globes and two consecutive Primetime Emmy Award nominations, as well as three Screen Actors Guild Awards. He reprised his role in the feature films, Downton Abbey (2019), and Downton Abbey: A New Era (2022). He also appeared in the films Notting Hill (1999), Iris (2001), The Monuments Men (2014), and the Paddington films (2014-2023).

Early life and education
Hugh Richard Bonniwell Williams was born on 10 November 1963 in Paddington, London. His mother was a nurse and his 
father was a urological surgeon. He was educated at Dulwich College Preparatory School in south London and at Sherborne School,.

Following secondary education, Bonneville read theology at Corpus Christi College, Cambridge. 
 He graduated from Cambridge with a 2:2 in theology. He went on to study at the Webber Douglas Academy of Dramatic Art in London.

Bonneville is an alumnus of the National Youth Theatre.

Career

1990s 
When he began acting, Bonneville chose Richard Bonneville, a variation of his middle names, as his stage name, because there was a well-known playwright named Hugh Williams. After appearing as Richard Bonneville for ten years, he changed Richard to Hugh.

Bonneville's first professional stage appearance was at the Open Air Theatre, Regent's Park. In 1987, he joined the National Theatre where he appeared in several plays, then the Royal Shakespeare Company in 1991, where he played Laertes to Kenneth Branagh's Hamlet (1992–1993). He played Valentine in The Two Gentlemen of Verona, Bergetto in 'Tis Pity She's a Whore, Kastril and later Surly in The Alchemist.

In 1994, Bonneville made his television debut, billed as Richard Bonneville in The Memoirs of Sherlock Holmes episode "The Dying Detective". His debut film was 1994's Mary Shelley's Frankenstein with Robert De Niro and Kenneth Branagh. In the 1997 James Bond film Tommorrow Never Dies, he had a small role playing a naval sailor onboard "HMS Bedford".  His early roles were usually good-natured bumbling characters like Bernie in Notting Hill (1999) and Mr Rushworth in Mansfield Park (1999).

2000s 
In the BBC television series, Take a Girl Like You (2000) and Armadillo (2001), he played more villainous characters, leading up to the domineering Henleigh Grandcourt in Daniel Deronda (2002) and the psychopathic killer James Lampton in The Commander (2003) series. In Love Again, he played the poet Philip Larkin.

In Iris (2001), he played the young John Bayley opposite Kate Winslet, with his performance lauded by critics and receiving a BAFTA nomination for Best Supporting Actor.
In 2004, Bonneville played Sir Christopher Wren in the docudrama Wren – The Man Who Built Britain.
Bonneville also works extensively in radio.
He played the role of Jerry Westerby in the BBC Radio 4 dramatisation of the John le Carré novel The Honourable Schoolboy, first broadcast in January 2010. Earlier, he appeared in the surreal parallel universe comedy Married.

2010s 
From 2010 until 2015, he appeared in the ITV period drama Downton Abbey, as Robert, Earl of Grantham, a role he repeated in the 2019 film. Bonneville again reprised the role of Robert Crawley in the 2022 film “Downton Abbey: A New Era.”

In early 2010, he appeared in the comedy film Burke and Hare. In 2011 and 2012, he starred as Ian Fletcher in the award-winning BBC comedy series Twenty Twelve, and reprised the role in the 2014 BBC comedy series W1A. In December 2012, he appeared on BBC Two with co-star Jessica Hynes in World's Most Dangerous Roads, travelling through Georgia. He also appeared in the much-delayed film Hippie Hippie Shake with Cillian Murphy and Sienna Miller.

From 2011 until 2014, Bonneville was the narrator of the Channel 4 show The Hotel. On 18 November 2012, Bonneville appeared on stage at St Martin's Theatre in the West End for a 60th anniversary performance of Agatha Christie's The Mousetrap, the world's longest-running play.

Bonneville played Mr. Brown in the 2014 film Paddington and its 2017 sequel Paddington 2. He has appeared in the singing comedic role of Peter the Pillager, the Pirate King, in the ABC fairy tale-themed musical comedy extravaganza series Galavant during its 2015 and 2016 seasons. He also narrated the ITV series The Cruise.

In 2017, Bonneville portrayed Lord Mountbatten in director Gurinder Chadha's film Viceroy's House, which depicted the tumult and violence surrounding the Partition of India during the final days of British rule. Also in 2017, he portrayed the voice of Merlin in the movie based on the children's TV series Thomas & Friends, Journey Beyond Sodor. Also that year, he narrated the documentary A Return to Grace: Luther's Life and Legacy and it was announced that Bonneville would play Roald Dahl in an upcoming biopic about the author.

In 2018, Bonneville succeeded Julie Andrews as host and narrator of the annual  "From Vienna: The New Year's Celebration" episode of Great Performances, broadcast on New Year's Day on PBS in the United States. Also in 2018, he returned to voice Merlin in one of the episodes of the twenty-second series of Thomas & Friends.

In 2019, Bonneville portrayed C. S. Lewis at the Chichester Festival Theatre's production of Shadowlands, along with actors Liz White and Andrew Havill.

2020s 

On 08 March 2023, Bonneville appeared on ITV’s DNA Journey with comedian, John Bishop.

Personal life
Bonneville married Lucinda "Lulu" Evans in 1998. They live with their son, Felix, in West Sussex.

In 2009, Bonneville was the voice of Justice Fosse in Joseph Crilly's British premiere of Kitty and Damnation for the Giant Olive Theatre Company at the Lion & Unicorn Theatre in Kentish Town. Shortly thereafter he became Giant Olive's first patron. Bonneville is also a patron of the London children's charity Scene & Heard and an ambassador for WaterAid.

On 8 October 2019, Bonneville was appointed as a Deputy Lieutenant of the County of West Sussex.

Works

Film

Television

Audiobooks

Awards

Honours

Commonwealth honours
 Commonwealth honours

Scholastic
 University degrees

Honorary degrees

References

Further reading
Trowbridge, Simon. The Company: A Biographical Dictionary of the Royal Shakespeare Company. Oxford: Editions Albert Creed, 2010. .

External links

Hugh Bonneville at the British Film Institute

1963 births
Living people
20th-century British male actors
21st-century British male actors
Alumni of Corpus Christi College, Cambridge
Alumni of the Webber Douglas Academy of Dramatic Art
British male film actors
British male Shakespearean actors
British male stage actors
British male television actors
British male voice actors
Deputy Lieutenants of West Sussex
Male actors from Kent
Male actors from London
National Youth Theatre members
People educated at Sherborne School
People from Blackheath, London
People from Paddington
Royal Shakespeare Company members